Events from the year 1786 in France.

Incumbents 
Monarch: Louis XVI

Events

September
26 September - The Eden Agreement, a trade treaty with Great Britain, is signed.
5 October - Death of Jean-Baptiste Marie de Piquet, Marquess of Méjanes; his book collection is bequeathed to form the basis of the Bibliothèque Méjanes at Aix-en-Provence.

Births
11 January - Louis Tromelin
13 January - Pierre-Dominique Bazaine
23 January - Auguste de Montferrand
2 February - Jacques Philippe Marie Binet
4 March - Amédée Despans-Cubières
31 March - Louis Vicat
20 April - Marc Seguin
9 July - Princess Sophie Hélène Béatrice of France
10 July - John Baptiste Henri Joseph Desmazières
31 August - Michel Eugène Chevreul
29 September - Auguste-François Michaut
10 October - François-Édouard Picot
21 October 
Henry Lemoine
Louis Isidore Duperrey
30 December - André Étienne d'Audebert de Férussac

Deaths
7 January - Jean-Étienne Guettard
14 January - Catherine-Nicole Lemaure
6 March - Charles Germain de Saint Aubin
22 June - Claude Arnulphy
2 August - François-Louis Gand Le Bland Du Roullet
20 December - Nicolas Thyrel de Boismont

See also

References

1780s in France